Perry Lee Moss (August 4, 1926 – August 7, 2014) was an American football player, coach, and executive. Moss played tailback at the University of Tulsa and quarterback at Illinois during the 1940s. As a Tulsa tailback, he was on the Orange Bowl team that beat Georgia Tech, 26–12, in the 1945 Orange Bowl and later as an Illinois T-quarterback, he directed a Rose Bowl team which routed UCLA, 45–14, in 1947. Moss served two years in the United States Air Force between his playing time at Tulsa and Illinois. At Illinois, he was named to All-Big Ten Conference and All-American teams. He was drafted in 1948 by the Green Bay Packers in the 13th round (111th pick overall) and played at the professional level for one year before returning to Illinois as an assistant. He started one game at quarterback for the Packers.

Moss served as head baseball coach and backfield coach at the University of Miami in 1955 and University of Wisconsin–Madison in 1958. In 1959, he was named as the head football coach and athletic director at Florida State, and compiled a 4–6 record and later at Marshall University in 1968 where he compiled an 0–9–1 record before resigning in the wake of NCAA recruiting violations. Twenty-eight members of the 1969 Thundering Herd presented a petition to West Virginia Governor Arch A. Moore Jr. to reinstate Moss for 1970, but the university instead named 1969 interim coach Rick Tolley, known as a brutal disciplinarian, to the post permanently. The decision undoubtedly saved Moss' life, for Tolley, 37 players and 37 others perished on November 14, 1970 in the crash of Southern Airways Flight 932 following Marshall's loss at East Carolina.

From 1960 through 1962 he was head coach of the Montreal Alouettes in the Canadian Football League. In the mid-1960s and again in the early 1980s he coached the Charleston Rockets of the semi-pro American Football Association. In the 1970s and early 1980s Moss was the offensive coordinator for the Chicago Bears, quarterbacks coach for the Green Bay Packers, had two stints as a position coach for the University of Kentucky under head coach Fran Curci, and was head coach of two teams in the American Football Association. In 1987, Moss was hired as the head coach of the Chicago Bruisers of the Arena Football League.

In 1991, he was named as first coach of the Orlando Predators of the Arena Football League and compiled a record of 59–25 before leaving the team in 1997. From 1986 to 1987, Moss was the Defensive Coordinator of the University of Central Florida, where he introduced the Chicago Bears '46' Defense, enabling UCF to record its first winning season in history. The following year, Moss's Defense led UCF to its first Division I-AA play-off appearance. Moss then resigned from UCF, and thereafter began coaching Arena Football.

Perry's son Les is also an American football coach.

Moss is a member of the Florida Sports Hall of Fame and Arena Football Hall of Fame. On August 7, 2014, Moss died at his home in Deltona, Florida, aged 88.

Head coaching record

College football

References

External links
 
 Coaching Page on ArenaFan.com

1926 births
2014 deaths
American Football Association (1977–1983)
American football quarterbacks
Continental Football League coaches
Chicago Bears coaches
Chicago Bruisers coaches
Florida State Seminoles football coaches
Florida State Seminoles athletic directors
Green Bay Packers coaches
Green Bay Packers players
Illinois Fighting Illini football coaches
Illinois Fighting Illini football players
Kentucky Wildcats football coaches
LSU Tigers football coaches
Marshall Thundering Herd football coaches
Massachusetts Marauders coaches
Miami Hurricanes baseball coaches
Miami Hurricanes football coaches
Montreal Alouettes coaches
Montreal Alouettes general managers
Orlando Predators coaches
San Antonio Wings coaches
Tulsa Golden Hurricane football players
Washington Huskies football coaches
Wisconsin Badgers football coaches
People from Deltona, Florida
Sportspeople from Tulsa, Oklahoma
Coaches of American football from Oklahoma
Players of American football from Oklahoma
Baseball coaches from Oklahoma